Non-uniform random variate generation or pseudo-random number sampling is the numerical practice of generating pseudo-random numbers (PRN) that follow a given probability distribution.
Methods are typically based on the availability of a uniformly distributed PRN generator. Computational algorithms are then used to manipulate a single random variate, X, or often several such variates, into a new random variate Y such that these values have the required distribution.
The first methods were developed for Monte-Carlo simulations in the Manhattan project, published by John von Neumann in the early 1950s.

Finite discrete distributions 

For a discrete probability distribution with a finite number n of indices at which the probability mass function f takes non-zero values, the basic sampling algorithm is straightforward. The interval [0, 1) is divided in n intervals [0, f(1)), [f(1), f(1) + f(2)), ... The width of interval i equals the probability f(i).
One draws a uniformly distributed pseudo-random number X, and searches for the index i of the corresponding interval. The so determined i will have the distribution f(i).

Formalizing this idea becomes easier by using the cumulative distribution function

It is convenient to set F(0) = 0.  The n intervals are then simply [F(0), F(1)), [F(1), F(2)), ..., [F(n − 1), F(n)). The main computational task is then to determine i for which F(i − 1) ≤ X < F(i).

This can be done by different algorithms:
 Linear search, computational time linear in n.
 Binary search, computational time goes with log n.
 Indexed search, also called the cutpoint method.
 Alias method, computational time is constant, using some pre-computed tables.
 There are other methods that cost constant time.

Continuous distributions 

Generic methods for generating independent samples:
 Rejection sampling for arbitrary density functions
 Inverse transform sampling for distributions whose CDF is known
 Ratio of uniforms, combining a change of variables and rejection sampling
 Slice sampling
 Ziggurat algorithm, for monotonically  decreasing density functions as well as symmetric unimodal distributions
 Convolution random number generator, not a sampling method in itself: it describes the use of arithmetics on top of one or more existing sampling methods to generate more involved distributions.

Generic methods for generating correlated samples (often necessary for unusually-shaped or high-dimensional distributions):
 Markov chain Monte Carlo, the general principle
 Metropolis–Hastings algorithm
 Gibbs sampling
 Slice sampling
 Reversible-jump Markov chain Monte Carlo, when the number of dimensions is not fixed (e.g. when estimating a mixture model and simultaneously estimating the number of mixture components)
 Particle filters, when the observed data is connected in a Markov chain and should be processed sequentially

For generating a normal distribution:
 Box–Muller transform
 Marsaglia polar method

For generating a Poisson distribution:
 See Poisson distribution#Generating Poisson-distributed random variables

Software libraries 

GNU Scientific Library has a section entitled "Random Number Distributions" with routines for sampling under more than twenty different distributions.

See also 
Beta distribution#Random variate generation
Dirichlet distribution#Random variate generation
Exponential distribution#Random variate generation
Gamma distribution#Random variate generation
Gumbel distribution#Random variate generation
Laplace distribution#Random variate generation
Multinomial distribution#Random variate distribution
Pareto distribution#Random variate generation
Poisson distribution#Random variate generation

Footnotes

Literature 

 Devroye, L. (1986) Non-Uniform Random Variate Generation. New York: Springer
 Fishman, G.S. (1996) Monte Carlo. Concepts, Algorithms, and Applications. New York: Springer
 Hörmann, W.; J Leydold, G Derflinger (2004,2011) Automatic Nonuniform Random Variate Generation. Berlin: Springer.
 Knuth, D.E. (1997) The Art of Computer Programming, Vol. 2 Seminumerical Algorithms, Chapter 3.4.1 (3rd edition).
 Ripley, B.D. (1987) Stochastic Simulation. Wiley.

Pseudorandom number generators
Non-uniform random numbers